WKJV-LP was a southern gospel and religious formatted broadcast radio station licensed to Bristol, Virginia, serving the twin cities of Bristol in Virginia and in Tennessee.  WKJV-LP was owned and operated by Belle Meadows Baptist Church. Its license was cancelled October 2, 2019.

References

2002 establishments in Virginia
Radio stations established in 2002
Defunct radio stations in the United States
KJV-LP
KJV-LP
Radio stations disestablished in 2019
2019 disestablishments in Virginia
Defunct religious radio stations in the United States
KJV-LP